Gyula Tarr (5 May 1931 – 24 January 2012) was a Hungarian wrestler. He competed in the men's Greco-Roman lightweight at the 1952 Summer Olympics.

References

1931 births
2012 deaths
Hungarian male sport wrestlers
Olympic wrestlers of Hungary
Wrestlers at the 1952 Summer Olympics
Martial artists from Budapest